Jeffery James Arnold (born July 26, 1967) is currently the VP of Cooperative Relations at Sky Helm, Managing Director of Bore St. Consulting, and a licensed Louisiana Real Estate Agent. Arnold was previously the CEO of the Association of Louisiana Electric Cooperatives. He was the former senior vice president of First NBC Bank in New Orleans, Louisiana. He was also the former dean of the Louisiana House of Representatives, he represented District 102, which encompasses the Algiers neighborhood. Arnold was first sent to the House in a special election held on April 6, 2002. He was hence term-limited and was ineligible to seek a fourth four-year term in the 2015 legislative elections. Instead, Arnold ran unsuccessfully for the District 7 seat in the Louisiana State Senate, which encompasses parts of the west bank of Orleans, Jefferson, and Plaquemines parishes.

Life and career
In his first election, he received 65.8 percent of the vote over four other Democratic candidates. In his most recent election on October 22, 2011, he polled 81.2 percent of the vote over an intraparty rival named Carlos Williams.

Arnold has served as the Chairman of the House Commerce Committee (2008–12) and Chairman of the House Judiciary Committee (2012–2016).

Arnold is a member of the Baptist Hospital Board of Advisors, former member of Holy Cross College Board of Advisors and a former Chairman of the Algiers Development District. He is also president of the Algiers Friendship Club.

Arnold was term limited from the House of Representatives and was a candidate in the surprise opening for State Senate race in 2015. He was defeated by fellow Democrat Troy Carter, a former member of the New Orleans City Council and current member of congress. Carter received 12,935 votes (56.8 percent); Arnold, 9,852 (43.2 percent).

Arnold can be seen as an extra on Killing It season 1 episode 3 “Dominique” on Peacock.

References

1967 births
Living people
Politicians from New Orleans
Democratic Party members of the Louisiana House of Representatives
Businesspeople from New Orleans
American bankers
Southeastern Louisiana University alumni
Catholics from Louisiana